The Uraci or Duraci (Greek: Urakoi) were a little-known Celtic people of pre-Roman Iberia who dwelt to the east of the Vaccaei and the Carpetani, occupying the southern Soria, northern Guadalajara and western Zaragoza provinces since the 4th century BC.

Origins 

Of mixed Illyrian and Gallic origin, the latter possibly related to the Helvetic Rauraci, the Uraci migrated to the Iberian Peninsula around the 4th Century BC during the Celtic migration, and their tribal name can be roughly translated as "those [placed] farther apart".

Location
The Uraci settled the eastern meseta and the southern slopes of the Central Iberian System mountains between the upper Duero and upper Henares rivers, being neighbours of the Carpetani. Their capital was the town of Lutiaca (Luzaga? – Guadalajara; Celtiberian mint: Lutiacos/Louitiscos); they also controlled the strategic towns of Cortona (Medinacelli – Soria), Segontia (Sigüenza – Guadalajara) and Arcobriga (Monreal de Ariza – Zaragoza).

Culture 
It is assumed that the Uraci spoke a 'Q-Celtic' language and archeological evidence shows that their material culture little differed from the Celtiberians.

History 

Forced to become clients of the powerful Arevaci around the late 4th or early 3rd Centuries BC, the Uraci were certainly obliged to provide military assistance to their patrons' throughout most of the 2nd Century BC, but what role they played in the 2nd Punic War and subsequent conflicts with Rome remains unclear. In about 92 BC the Uraci began to overthrow Arevacian overlordship – quite plausibly at Roman instigation – being rewarded with the town of Numantia from the defeated Pellendones for helping the Romans in suppressing the early 1st Century BC anti-Roman uprisings in Celtiberia (the 4th Celtiberian War). However, they recovered their independence only for a short period at the end of the Sertorian Wars in 72 BC, after which they were included as Roman allies into pacified southern Celtiberia.

See also 
Celtiberian confederacy
Celtiberian script
Celtiberian Wars
Helvetii
Illyrians
Numantine War
Pre-Roman peoples of the Iberian Peninsula

Notes

References

 Ángel Montenegro et alii, Historia de España 2 - colonizaciones y formación de los pueblos prerromanos (1200-218 a.C), Editorial Gredos, Madrid (1989) 
 Francisco Burillo Mozota, Los Celtíberos, etnias y estados, Crítica, Grijalbo Mondadori, S.A., Barcelona (1998, revised edition 2007)

External links
http://www.celtiberia.net

Pre-Roman peoples of the Iberian Peninsula
Celtic tribes of the Iberian Peninsula
Ancient peoples of Spain